Pakhral Rajputis are a sub clan of Minhas Rajput. The founders of the city and the state of Jammu and its governors from ancient times until 1948. The ancestors of Pakhral Rajputs are mostly Hindu. In the early 18th and 19th centuries mostly Pakhral Rajputs embraced Islam and moved from Jaipur and Rajasthan (India) to Kashmir and Pakistan. Punjab particularly the area of Pothohar and Azad Jammu Kashmir is the origin of Pakhral Rajputs. Mirpur Azad Jammu Kashmir and Rawalpindi District mostly named as Potohar area is famous as Pakhral Rajputs area. Raja is mostly used as a title in Pakhral Rajputs which is derived from the word Rajput. Still several Pakhral Rajputs live in many regions of Pakistan and India. Pakhral Rajputs also contributed to the British and Pakistani armies.Raja Muhammad Akbar (of Krakan Sohawa) receives two Medals of Courage (Tamgha-e-Jurrat) both in 1965 and in the 1971 Indo-Pakistan war. These people are also known as Zamindar .

Origin                                                                        
When Kashmir was sold to Gulab Singh the descendants of raja Jambu Lochan moved to Azad Kashmir Pothar Khyber Pakhtoon Khawa and other areas it is said that they were in fact four brothers who moved from Kashmir to these areas (today these areas are Rawalpindi (Mastala, Adhi , Natha Chatar, Daultala, Nata, Dhokabdal, Mora Nori etc.) Jehlum, Chakwal (Dhoda, Jandala Pakhral, Ghazial, Khokhar Rajgan and Saba Mohra), Azad Kashmir and some parts of Khyber Pakhtoon Khawa). Some sons of these four brothers also moved to the modern day places Gujar Khan.

Genealogical trees
This is a strong tradition that exists among the most distinguished of Rajputs of all faiths, the registration of surnames and the length of the family tree. Prominent Muslim Rajputs remain and continue to record their family trees from their Hindus beyond even after their conversion to Islam, right up to the present day. Rajput inheritance applicants more than likely will have no ancestral records of family lineage. Like other Rajputs People the Pakhral Tribe also attach great importance to their Family Tree.

Notable people
 Rashid Minhas was awarded Pakistan's top military honor, the Nishan-E-Haider, and became the youngest man and the only member of the Pakistan Air Force to win this award.
 Farzana Raja, a serving member of the President's Support Program and the Benazir Income National Assembly.
 Raja Pervaiz Ashraf, the 17th Prime Minister of Pakistan.

References

Rajput clans